Shelley Mayfield (June 19, 1924 – March 22, 2010) was an American golf course architect and professional golfer who played on the PGA Tour in the 1950s.

Early life 
Mayfield was born in Liberty Hill, Texas near Austin and grew up in Seguin near San Antonio. He was a star athlete in several sports at Seguin High School including golf, which he began playing at age 14. His team won several state championships under coach W.A. "Lefty" Stackhouse.

Professional career 
Mayfield became a golf professional at the age of 24. Like most professional golfers of his generation, he earned his living primarily as a club pro.  His first job was as an assistant for Claude Harmon at Winged Foot Golf Club in Mamaroneck, New York, a position he held for two years. The two later worked together at Seminole Golf Club in Florida for one year. He served as the head professional at Rockaway Hunting Club in Cedarhurst, New York from 1950 to 1952. In 1955, Mayfield went to work at the exclusive Meadowbrook Golf and Polo Club on Long Island, where he stayed until 1963. He then became the head club pro at Brook Hollow Country Club in Dallas until 1982 when he retired.

Mayfield won three PGA Tour events during his career. He had two top-10 finishes in major championships, T-6 at the 1954 U.S.Open and T-8 at the 1956 Masters Tournament. He also reached the semi-final of the 1955 PGA Championship, having reached the quarter-final the previous year.

Courses that Mayfield helped design, most as a partner with famed course architect Dick Wilson, included the Doral Country Club and Pine Tree Golf Club in Florida and California's Bay Hill Golf Club and La Costa Country Club. Giving back to the town where he learned to play the game, he designed the back-nine added to the course at Max Starcke Park in Seguin, Texas.

In 1992 Mayfield was elected to the Texas Golf Hall of Fame.

Personal life 
Mayfield retired to his ranch in Carrizo Springs, Texas. He died in San Antonio, Texas at the age of 85.

Professional wins (5)

PGA Tour wins (3)

PGA Tour playoff record (1–1)

Other wins (2)
this list is probably incomplete
1954 San Francisco Open
1957 Long Island Open

Results in major championships

Note: Mayfield never played in The Open Championship.

WD = withdrew
CUT = missed the half-way cut
R64, R32, R16, QF, SF = round in which player lost in PGA Championship match play
"T" indicates a tie for a place

References

American male golfers
PGA Tour golfers
Golf course architects
Golfers from Texas
People from Liberty Hill, Texas
People from Seguin, Texas
People from Carrizo Springs, Texas
1924 births
2010 deaths